RISE Research Institutes of Sweden AB (RISE) is a Swedish state-owned research institute that collaborates with universities, industry and the public sector.

RISE performs industry research and innovation, as well as, testing and certification. According to the research proposition of the Swedish government, the overall objective for the RISE group research institutes is to be internationally competitive and work for sustainable growth in Sweden, by strengthening industry competitiveness and renewal. 
/ Paraphrase from the research proposition 2016/17:50 (Kunskap i samverkan)

In January 2021, RISE had approximately 2 800 employees over five organisational divisions:
 Bioeconomy and Health
 Materials and Production
 Digital systems
 Built Environment
 Safety and Transport

Up until 2019/2020 RISE had six divisions that was reorganised into the 5 divisions listed above. The former divisions were Bioeconomy, Bioscience and Materials, Materials and Production, ICT, Built Environment, and Safety and Transport.

RISE operates in more than 25 cities all over Sweden and also has facilities in Denmark, Norway, Great Britain, France and Belgium. In 2019, RISE had a turnover of 3,57 billion SEK.

Sustainability 

RISE produce sustainability reports for projects and services, which in 2018 were produced for 74 projects. Since 2019 RISE has had a sustainability strategy, that spans over six years, and which are partly connected to the UN Sustainable Development Goals as well as the organisations' both negative and positive impact on sustainability through internal activities (e.g. travels) as well as impact through research projects and services.

 Electricity use per employee (kWh): 11 125, 2020 (14 823, 2019)
 Business trips CO2 emissions per employee (kg): 224, 2020 (763, 2019)
 Projects having a Sustainability Declaration: 83 per cent, 2020 (20 per cent, 2019)

Ownership and history 
RISE AB was founded in 1997 under the name Ireco Holding AB by the Ministry of Enterprise, Energy and Communications, now called The Ministry of Enterprise and Innovation (Sweden), and the government agency The Knowledge Foundation. Its first assignment was to, together with owners and other interested parties review the structure and, in which case it was called for, turn trusts into registered corporations. This was performed mainly up until 2002.

In 2007, the IRECO Holding AB became wholly state-owned in 2007, and organised its operations into different corporate groups: Innventia, SP Sveriges Tekniska Forskningsinstitut, Swedish ICT and Swerea. In 2009, the company changed its name to RISE Research Institutes of Sweden Holding AB and received an expanded mandate and significantly increased resources. Since 2016 RISE Research Institutes of Sweden is the sole owner of Sweden Holding AB Innventia, the Swedish ICT companies, and most companies within the SP group. Since 2017 they all operate under the RISE brand name.

In 2018 RISE Research Institutes of Sweden Holding AB merged with the subsidiary RISE Research Institutes of Sweden AB and took the latter name: RISE Research Institutes of Sweden AB. In October 2018, two thirds of the Swerea group became fully owned by RISE.

The RISE group 

RISE Research Institutes of Sweden consists of five divisions that gather the operations of former autonomous research institutes and their subsidiaries.
 Innventia (paper, pulp, packaging and biofuel)
 SP Technical Research Institute of Sweden
 SP Process Development AB
 RISE Energy Technology Center
 RISE Fire Research AS
 CBI, Swedish Cement and Concrete Research Institute
 Glafo, Glass Research Institute
 JTI, Swedish Institute of Agricultutral and Environmental Engineering
 SIK, Swedish Institute for Food and Biotechnology
 SMP, Swedish Machinery Testing Institute
 YKI, Institute for Surface Chemistry (since January 2013 integrated part of SP's Chemistry, Materials and Surfaces unit)
 Swedish ICT (information and communications technology)
 Acreo Swedish ICT
 RISE Interactive Institute AB
 SICS Swedish ICT
 RISE Viktoria AB
 Swerea (materials technology)
 Swerea IVF
 Swerea KIMAB
 Swerea SICOMP
 Swerea SWECAST
 RISE Processum AB (60% ownership)
 MoRe Research (60% ownership)

References

External links 

 RISE Research Institutes of Sweden

Research institutes in Sweden
International research institutes